Ad Perpetuam Memoriam (APM) was an independent record label based in Borlänge, Sweden.

The label releases a mixture of musical styles, in the area of progressive rock and symphonic rock Artists on APM include Death Organ, Höyry-kone, Catweazle.

Discography
APM9201                 Kultivator: Barndomens stigar (Swe)
APM9302                 Myrbein: Myrornas krig (Swe)
APM9403 AT              Ensemble Nimbus: Key Figures (Swe)
APM9404                 Jasun Martz: The Pillory (USA)
APM9405/SYMPHILIS1      Zaragon: No Return (Den)
APM9506 AT/Ad INFERNOS1 Death Organ: 9 to 5 (Swe)
APM9507/SYMPHILIS2      Akasha: Akasha (Nor)
APM9508/SYMPHILIS3      Atlas: Blå Vardag (Swe)
APM9509 AT              Simon Steensland: The Zombie Hunter (Swe)
APM9510 AT              Höyry-Kone: Hyönteisiä Voi Rakastaa
APM9511                 Eskaton: 4 Visions (Fra)
APM9612 AT/SYMPHILIS4   Catweazle: Ars Moriendi (Swe)
APM9613 AT/SYMPHILIS5   In The Labyrinth: The Garden Of Mysteries (Swe)
APM9614 AT/SYMPHILIS6   Zello: Zello (Swe)
APM9715                 Tömrerclaus: Same (Den)
APM9616 AT              Evidence: Heart's Grave (Fra)
APM9717 /SYMPHILIS7     Blåkulla: Blåkulla (Swe)
APM9718 AT/AD INFERNOS2 Death Organ: Universal Stripsearch (Swe)
APM9720 AT              Höyry-Kone: Huono Parturi (Fin)

Due to limited finances APM9719 was never released.

See also 
 List of record labels

References

Swedish independent record labels
Reissue record labels
Progressive rock record labels